Bouzas is a surname. Notable people with the surname include:

Dani Bouzas (born 1974), Spanish footballer 
Rómulo Bouzas (born 1978), Mexican rower
Vasilis Bouzas (born 1993), Greek footballer

See also
Bouza (surname)